Attila Kálnoki Kis (born 30 October 1965) is a Hungarian modern pentathlete. He competed at the 1992 Summer Olympics.

References

External links
 

1965 births
Living people
Hungarian male modern pentathletes
Olympic modern pentathletes of Hungary
Modern pentathletes at the 1992 Summer Olympics
20th-century Hungarian people
21st-century Hungarian people